Yang Yuting (1886 – January 10, 1929) was a Fengtian Army general and Military Governor (warlord) of Jiangsu during the early period of the Republic of China (Beiyang government) from August to November 1925. He was executed by Zhang Xueliang during a political power struggle.

Biography
A native of Shenyang, Yang was sent to Japan by the Qing government in 1904 to study at the Tokyo Shimbu Gakko, a military preparatory school. He continued his education at the Imperial Japanese Army Academy, specializing in artillery. He returned to China after the Xinhai Revolution of 1911 and served in various military posts in the Beiyang government, and was chief of staff to Zhang Zuolin, the founder of the Fengtian clique, during the First Zhili–Fengtian War of 1922 and the Second Zhili–Fengtian War of 1924. He was governor of Jiangsu Province from August–November 1925. During Guo Songling's uprising against Zhang Zuolin (Anti-Fengtian War), he was forced to retreat to Dalian and seek help from the Japanese Kwantung Army.

In 1928, after the assassination of Zhang Zuolin in the Huanggutun Incident, Yang came into increasing conflict with Zhang's son and heir, Zhang Xueliang. He was particularly opposed to the Northeast Flag Replacement, which united Manchuria with the Kuomintang government of the Republic of China. He was invited by Zhang to his home to play cards; when he arrived, he was seized and executed by firing squad on January 10.

Sources

  Rulers: Chinese Administrative divisions, Jiangsu

1886 births
1929 deaths
Politicians from Shenyang
Military governors of Jiangsu
Executed Republic of China people
Republic of China warlords from Liaoning
People executed by the Republic of China